Adrian Michael Wiggins (born October 15, 1973) is an American basketball coach who is currently head boys' basketball coach at Clovis East High School. Prior to that, he was the head women's basketball coach at Fresno State.

Early life and education
Born and raised in Lawton, Oklahoma, Wiggins graduated from MacArthur High School in 1991. At MacArthur, Wiggins was an all-state pitcher on the baseball team in addition to playing basketball.

After high school, Wiggins attended Cameron University, a Division II school in Lawton, and played on the baseball team for four years at pitcher and outfielder. As a senior in 1995, Wiggins had a 4–4 record with a 4.84 ERA and 35 strikeouts in 14 pitching appearances with 12 starts. He also had a .265 batting average with eight home runs, eight doubles, and 33 RBI in 49 games.Final 1995 Baseball Statistics Report: Cameron University Wiggins graduated from Cameron in 1995 with a bachelor's degree in psychology.

Coaching career

YMCA and Lawton High
From 1992 to 1996, Wiggins helped organize a midnight basketball league at the Lawton YMCA, in addition to being a camp counselor. In 1996, he was a boys' varsity basketball assistant coach at Lawton High School, then was promoted to head coach a year later and stayed for two years.

Cameron
In 1999, Wiggins returned to Cameron to be a women's basketball  assistant coach, before being promoted to head coach on May 31, 2000. In the 2001–02 season, he led Cameron to a 25–5 record, the Lone Star Conference North Division title, and first-ever NCAA Division II Tournament appearance.

Fresno State
Wiggins moved up to the Division I level in 2002 as an assistant coach at Fresno State, first under Britt King in 2002–03 and Stacy Johnson-Klein in the next season. On February 9, 2005, Wiggins became interim head coach while Johnson-Klein was suspended and subsequently fired. Wiggins had a 7–4 record in his time as interim head coach at the end of the 2004–05 season, including an appearance in the WNIT. Wiggins continued to be interim head coach during the 2005–06 season as Fresno State conducted a national search for a long-term head coach. After completing a historically best 24–8 season and second straight WNIT appearance, Wiggins was promoted to the head coaching position long term on April 7, 2006. In the subsequent seasons, Wiggins led the team to six straight winning seasons, including five straight NCAA Tournament appearances from 2008 to 2012.

Ole Miss
On March 26, 2012, Wiggins was hired at the University of Mississippi (Ole Miss). However, on October 20, prior to the season, the university placed Wiggins on administrative leave and fired two of his assistant coaches due to NCAA violations, namely improper academic and recruiting conduct. Two days later, Mississippi fired Wiggins.

Clovis East High
In January 2013, Wiggins was hired at Clovis East High as boys' varsity basketball head coach, effective in the following school year. In three seasons, Wiggins has gone 53–33 at Clovis East.

Head coaching record

*Wiggins took over as interim head coach on February 9, 2005, after the suspension of Stacy Johnson-Klein. Their cumulative record for the season was 20–11 (10–8 WAC).

References

1973 births
Living people
American women's basketball coaches
Baseball outfielders
Baseball pitchers
Baseball players from Oklahoma
Basketball coaches from Oklahoma
Cameron Aggies baseball players
Cameron Aggies women's basketball coaches
Fresno State Bulldogs women's basketball coaches
High school basketball coaches in the United States
People from Lawton, Oklahoma